The Irish National Invincibles, usually known as the Invincibles, were a freedom fighter organization based in Ireland active from 1881 to 1883. Founded as splinter group of the Irish Republican Brotherhood, the group had a more radical agenda, and was formed with an intent to target those who implemented  English policies in Ireland.

Phoenix Park Attack

After numerous attempts on his life, Chief Secretary for Ireland William Edward "Buckshot" Forster resigned in protest of the Kilmainham Treaty. The Invincibles settled on a plan to kill the Permanent Under Secretary Thomas Henry Burke at the Irish Office. The newly installed Chief Secretary for Ireland, Lord Frederick Cavendish, was walking with Burke on the day of his arrival in Ireland when they struck, in Phoenix Park, Dublin, at 17:30 Saturday, 6 May 1882.

Joe Brady attacked Burke, followed in short order by Tim Kelly, who knifed Cavendish. Both men used surgical knives.

A large number of suspects were arrested, interrogated and tortured. Superintendent Mallon of "G" Division of the Dublin Metropolitan Police got several of them to reveal what they knew. The Invincibles' leader, James Carey, and Michael Kavanagh agreed to testify against the others. Joe Brady, Michael Fagan, Thomas Caffrey, Dan Curley and Tim Kelly were hanged by William Marwood in Kilmainham Gaol in Dublin between 14 May and 4 June 1883. Others were sentenced to long prison terms.

No member of the founding executive, however, was ever brought to trial by the British government. John Walsh, Patrick Egan, John Sheridan, Frank Byrne, and Patrick Tynan fled to the United States.

Aftermath
Carey was shot dead on board Melrose Castle off Cape Town, South Africa, on 29 July 1883, by Donegal man Patrick O'Donnell, for giving evidence against his former comrades. O'Donnell was apprehended and escorted back to London, where he was convicted of murder at the Old Bailey and hanged on 17 December 1883.

In literature and song 
In Episode Seven of James Joyce's Ulysses, Stephen Dedalus and other characters discuss the assassinations in the offices of the Freeman newspaper. In Episode Sixteen Bloom and Dedalus stop in a cabman's shelter run by a man they believe to be James 'Skin-the-Goat' Fitzharris.

The Invincibles and Carey are mentioned in the folk song "Monto (Take Her Up To Monto)":

When Carey told on Skin-the-goat,   
O'Donnell caught him on the boat   
He wished he'd never been afloat, the filthy skite.   
Twasn't very sensible   
To tell on the Invincibles   
They stood up for their principles, day and night by going up to Monto Monto......"

References

External links 
 Podcast about the Irish National Invincibles and the Fenian Dynamite Campaign with Dr. Shane Kenna.
  The Phoenix Park Murders 

Irish Republican Brotherhood
Defunct organisations based in Ireland
History of Ireland (1801–1923)
Irish revolutionaries
Organisations based in Dublin (city)
History of County Dublin
Anti-imperialism in Europe
Irish nationalist assassins
Irish republican militant groups